s-Gravenweg 168, Kralingen, Rotterdam is a Louis XIV-XV façade house ca. 1850 that is classified as a  Dutch National Heritage Site (number: 32911).

References

Rijksmonuments in Rotterdam
Houses completed in 1850